John McEnery (March 31, 1833, Petersburg, Virginia – March 28, 1891) was a Louisiana Democratic politician and lawyer who was considered by Democrats to be the winner of the highly contested 1872 election for Governor of Louisiana. After extended controversy over election results, the Republican candidate William Pitt Kellogg was certified. McEnery, who had been an officer in the Confederate States Army during the American Civil War, was not allowed to take office following a weighing in by the federal government and local Republicans loyal to President Ulysses S. Grant.

In the election of 1872, McEnery, a Democrat, was supported by a coalition of Democrats and anti-Grant Republicans, including Republican Gov. Henry C. Warmoth. Warmoth's opponents in the Republican Party remained loyal to President Grant, and supported Republican nominee William Pitt Kellogg.

Governor Warmoth had appointed the State Returning Board, which administered elections. A rival board endorsed Kellogg, although Kellogg's board had no returns or ballots to count;  Warmoth was impeached and removed for "stealing" the election. The lieutenant governor, black Republican P. B. S. Pinchback, became governor for the last 35 days of Warmoth's term. Both McEnery and Kellogg had inaugural parties and certified lists of local officeholders. In the spring of 1873, McEnery and his friends formed a rump legislature in New Orleans.

After a failed attempt in 1873, five thousand of his armed white militia entered New Orleans and fought off the police and state militia on September 14, 1874. They occupied the statehouse and armory and turned the Republican Kellogg out of office. This was called the Battle of Liberty Place. It was not until Federal troops were on their way that the forces retreated from New Orleans. McEnery had encouraged armed action in a speech in June:

The extended controversy contributed to violence throughout the state. The Colfax Massacre on Easter Sunday 1873 was related to the contested election. White Democratic militia, raised from surrounding parishes, attacked Republican blacks who had gathered at the Colfax courthouse to defend Republican officeholders. The attackers killed more than 80 black men; three whites were killed. The events were preceded by rumors on both sides, as tensions rose in the parish.

Similarly, in Coushatta, the seat of the new Red River Parish, Republican Marshall H. Twitchell was the influential state senator. White militia drove six Republican officeholders from town, but killed them before they could leave the state. In 1874, whites in Grant Parish who had been part of the militia at Colfax, formed the first chapter of the paramilitary organization the White League. They served as an arm of the Democratic Party in driving out Republicans and suppressing black voting at elections. Grant Parish and Colfax, formed under the Reconstruction legislature, were named for Reconstruction President Grant and Vice President Schuyler Colfax.

McEnery's prominent identification with white supremacy assisted his brother Samuel McEnery in being elected Lieutenant Governor of Louisiana in 1880. Samuel McEnery succeeded to the Governorship after Louis Wiltz died, and retained the office until 1888. Amid allegations of corruption, Samuel McEnery was not re-elected that year.

References

External links
State of Louisiana – Biography
National Governors Association
Cemetery Memorial by La-Cemeteries

 John and Samuel McEnery Papers at  The Historic New Orleans Collection

1833 births
1891 deaths
Politicians from Petersburg, Virginia
Democratic Party governors of Louisiana
Confederate States Army officers
19th-century American politicians
Tulane University alumni